Foetorepus garthi is a species of ray-finned fish within the family Callionymidae. It is native to the southeast Pacific off Port Utria in Colombia, where it lives a dermersal lifestyle in marine waters.

References 

Fish of Colombia
Fish of the Pacific Ocean
Fish described in 1940